Hardenbergh is a surname. Notable people with the surname include:

 Augustus Albert Hardenbergh, Congressman from New Jersey
 Cornelius A.J. Hardenbergh, politician from New York
 Henry Janeway Hardenbergh, American architect
 Johannes Hardenbergh, High Sheriff
 Jacob Hardenbergh (1823–1872), New York politician
 Jacob Rutsen Hardenbergh (1736–1790), First President of Rutgers, grandson of Johannes

See also 
 Hardenbergh, alternate name for Hardenburg, California
 Isaac Hardenbergh House (also known as The Hardenbergh Manor)
 Hardenberg (surname)
 Hardenberg (disambiguation)
 Hardenburg (disambiguation)

Dutch-language surnames